Wild Company is a 1930 American pre-Code drama film directed by Leo McCarey and written by Bradley King. The film stars Frank Albertson, Joyce Compton, Sharon Lynn, H. B. Warner, Richard Keene and Frances McCoy. The film was released on July 5, 1930, by Fox Film Corporation. Although Bela Lugosi had a relatively brief role in this film as a nightclub owner, his character's murder provides a pivotal plot point.

Plot
Wastrel Larry Grayson constantly drains his wealthy father Henry Grayson's fortune to spend the money in a speakeasy where singer Sally Curtis entertains. Gangster Joe Hardy tells Sally to befriend Larry so that he can pin a murder rap on the young man. Larry winds up getting framed for the shooting murder of nightclub owner Felix Brown (Lugosi), and his wealthy father turns him over to the police. A criminal trial results in the young man receiving a suspended sentence and a lengthy lecture about how "partying and jazz music" can lead to the downfall of youths.

Cast 
Frank Albertson as Larry Grayson, rich wastrel
H. B. Warner as millionaire Henry Grayson
Joyce Compton as Anita Grayson
Claire McDowell as Mrs. Laura Grayson
Sharon Lynn as Sally Curtis, nightclub singer
Kenneth Thomson as Joe Hardy, gangster
Richard Keene as Dick
Frances McCoy as Cora Diltz
Mildred Van Dorn as Natalie
Bob Callahan as Eddie Graham 
Bela Lugosi as Felix Brown, nightclub owner

References

External links 
 

1930 films
Fox Film films
American drama films
1930 drama films
Films directed by Leo McCarey
American black-and-white films
1930s English-language films
1930s American films